Evandro Roncatto (born 24 May 1986 in Campinas, São Paulo) is a Brazilian footballer who  plays as a forward for Clube Oriental de Lisboa. Before that, he played for Cypriot side Anorthosis Famagusta FC and Beroe Stara Zagora in Bulgaria. Roncatto is of Italian descent, and has played for Portuguese clubs like Paços de Ferreira and Belenenses.

Roncatto is a former Brazilian youth international.

Club career 
Roncatto started his career in his home country, Brazil. He started at Guarani, where he grew out to be a Brazilian U-17 player. He was signed by Sport Club do Recife in 2006, and made his way to Europe in 2007, to play for Os Belenenses in Portugal. Here, he struggled with the high expectations of being a prominent youth international, and was finally signed by Paços de Ferreira, where he never really impressed. Roncatto joined Ermis Aradippou in 2010. Then in the following year he moved to Anorthosis Famagusta. Roncatto played in the A PFG as part of the Beroe Stara Zagora team between 30 July and late November 2013, mostly featuring as a substitute.

International career
During 2003, he won the FIFA U-17 World Championship with Brazil and was also a runner-up in the South American U-17 Championship.

Honours

National team

Brazil U17
 FIFA U-17 World Cup:
 Champion: 2003
 South American Under-17 Football Championship :
 Runner-up: 2003

References

External links

 CBF
FIFA.com

1986 births
Living people
Brazilian footballers
Brazil youth international footballers
Brazilian expatriate footballers

Liga Portugal 2 players
Primeira Liga players
First Professional Football League (Bulgaria) players
Cypriot First Division players
Football League (Greece) players
Kazakhstan Premier League players
Norwegian First Division players
Campeonato de Portugal (league) players

Guarani FC players
Esporte Clube Santo André players
Clube Náutico Capibaribe players
Paysandu Sport Club players
Ipatinga Futebol Clube players
C.F. Os Belenenses players
F.C. Paços de Ferreira players
Ermis Aradippou FC players
Anorthosis Famagusta F.C. players
PFC Beroe Stara Zagora players
Niki Volos F.C. players
Clube Oriental de Lisboa players
FC Irtysh Pavlodar players
Rio Branco Esporte Clube players
Raufoss IL players
FC Cascavel players
Kalamata F.C. players
Casa Pia A.C. players
Clube Olímpico do Montijo players
Association football forwards
Brazilian people of Italian descent
Sportspeople from Campinas
Brazilian expatriate sportspeople in Portugal
Brazilian expatriate sportspeople in Cyprus
Brazilian expatriate sportspeople in Bulgaria
Brazilian expatriate sportspeople in Greece
Brazilian expatriate sportspeople in Kazakhstan
Brazilian expatriate sportspeople in Norway
Expatriate footballers in Portugal
Expatriate footballers in Cyprus
Expatriate footballers in Bulgaria
Expatriate footballers in Greece
Expatriate footballers in Kazakhstan
Expatriate footballers in Norway